Wade Kapszukiewicz (born October 30, 1972) is an American politician serving as the 64th mayor of Toledo, Ohio. A member of the Democratic Party, he previously served as treasurer of Lucas County, Ohio.

Early life and education 
Kapszukiewicz was born in San Diego, California, where his father was stationed in the U.S. Navy. After his father's service ended, the family moved back to Toledo. Kapszukiewicz earned a bachelor's degree in journalism and political science from Marquette University in 1994 and was named the valedictorian of the College of Communication, Journalism, and Performing Arts. He received a master's degree in public policy from the University of Michigan in 1996.

Career

Early Elected Office
Kapszukiewicz served as Lucas County Treasurer from 2005 until 2018. While treasurer, he worked to change state law in 2010 to allow for the creation of county land banks, founded the Lucas County Land Bank, and served as its chairman from 2010 to 2019. 

He served one term on the Lucas County Board of Education and was later a Toledo city councilman for nearly seven years. He was first elected to City Council in 1999 and then re-elected in 2001 and 2003. When he began his service on Toledo City Council, at age 26, Kapszukiewicz had the distinction of being the youngest person to serve on the legislative body in 25 years.

Mayor of Toledo 
In his first term as mayor, Kapszukiewicz achieved all of his administration’s top goals. He successfully:

 created a regional water system, ensuring long-term affordable water rates while sharing decision-making authority with suburban partners.
 increased the size of the police force.
 restored discipline to the city’s budget, turning a $3 million dollar deficit into a more than $40 million surplus, even in the aftermath of the COVID-19 pandemic.
 improved educational opportunities for Toledo’s youngest residents through the Hope Toledo partnership at no additional cost to taxpayers.
 improved delivery of city services, such as increasing the number of roads repaired annually by nearly 15-fold.
 presided over a period of strong economic growth in Toledo, resulting in Site Selection Magazine naming Toledo first in the nation for economic     development among mid-sized cities in 2020.
 launched a monthly "Wednesdays with Wade" public meetings series and corresponding “Wednesdays with Wade” newsletter to encourage greater transparency in city government, reaching more than 60,000 residents weekly.

During his second term, Kapszukiewicz's work has focused on investing resources and implementing the Toledo Recovery Plan. Among other improvements, the plan has continued to increase the size of safety forces, makes historic investments in youth programming and summer jobs, builds a YMCA in a historically disinvested neighborhood in the central city, creates new affordable housing, demolishes and rehabilitates blighted properties, and improves and enhances city parks.

Work Outside of Government 
After receiving his master's degree, Kapszukiewicz worked for two years as the Policy Analysis and Research Director of the New Ohio Institute, a public policy research organization that studied issues affecting Ohio's urban areas. In April 1998 he accepted the position of Manager of Planning and Development at the Lucas County Mental Health Board, where he worked until he began serving on Toledo City Council. While on City Council, Kapszukiewicz taught a course in American Government at Owens Community College and also worked at COMPASS, a social service agency that works with people with drug and alcohol addictions. Most recently, Kapszukiewicz was an adjunct professor at Lourdes University where he taught courses in Urban Policy.

Recognitions and Awards 
Kapszukiewicz was recognized in 2006 as a "20 Under 40" community leader, and in 2010 ESOP gave him its “Above and Beyond” award. In 2012, he was again honored by ESOP, this time earning its “Rooted in ESOP” award. The Toledo City Paper named him one of its “Big Idea Toledoans” in 2014 for his work creating and leading the Lucas County Land Bank, and again in 2018 for his commitment to pursue an ambitious agenda as mayor. In 2021, the U.S. Global Leadership Coalition awarded Kapszukiewicz with its Global Statesman Award for his advocacy. In 2022, Kapszukiewicz was selected to participate in the Bloomberg Harvard City Leadership Initiative's sixth class of mayors.

An avid baseball fan, Kapszukiewicz has also had his research published in the Spring 2016 edition of the Society for American Baseball Research journal.

Personal life 
Kapszukiewicz is a parishioner at Gesu Roman Catholic Church. He and his wife, Sarah, celebrated their 21st wedding anniversary in 2022. They live in the Old Orchard neighborhood of Toledo and have two children, Emma and Will.

Electoral history
Kapszukiewicz was first elected mayor of Toledo, Ohio on November 7, 2017 after defeating incumbent Mayor Paula Hicks-Hudson. Kapszukiewicz received over 55 percent of the vote, winning by an 11 percent margin. 

On November 2, 2021, Kapszukiewicz overwhelmingly won a second term by defeating former Toledo Mayor Carty Finkbeiner, winning by a record margin with 68.9 percent of the vote. The previous record was set in 2005 when Finkbeiner himself defeated incumbent Jack Ford with 61.8 percent of the vote.

2021

2017

References

External links

1972 births
Living people
American people of Polish descent
Mayors of Toledo, Ohio
Ohio Democrats
21st-century American politicians
Marquette University alumni
Gerald R. Ford School of Public Policy alumni
People from San Diego